The 2018 Wyoming gubernatorial election took place on November 6, 2018, to elect the Governor of Wyoming. Incumbent Republican Governor Matt Mead was term-limited and could not seek re-election to a third consecutive term. Republican nominee Mark Gordon defeated Democratic nominee Mary Throne by nearly 40 percentage points. This was the first time since 1978 that a candidate from the President's party was elected governor in Wyoming.

Republican primary

Candidates

Nominated
 Mark Gordon, Wyoming State Treasurer

Declared
 Bill Dahlin, businessman
 Foster Friess, businessman and activist
 Sam Galeotos, businessman
 Harriet Hageman, attorney
 Taylor Haynes, physician, write-in candidate for governor in 2010 and candidate for governor in 2014

Withdrew
 Rex Rammell, veterinarian and perennial candidate (running for Constitution Party nomination)

Endorsements

Polling

Results

Democratic primary

Candidates

Nominated
 Mary Throne, former Minority Leader of the Wyoming House of Representatives

Declared
 Ken Casner, candidate for governor in 2002
 Michael Allen Green, nominee for the U.S. House of Representatives in 2000
 Rex Wilde, candidate for governor in 2010

Declined
James W. Byrd, state representative (running for secretary of state)
 Ryan Greene, nominee for the U.S. House of Representatives in 2016 (running for Mayor of Rock Springs)
 Chris Rothfuss, Minority Leader of the Wyoming Senate and nominee for U.S. Senate in 2008
 Milward Simpson, director of the Wyoming Nature Conservancy
 Gary Trauner, businessman and nominee for U.S. House of Representatives in 2006 and 2008 (running for U.S. Senate)

Endorsements

Results

Independents and third parties

Candidates

Declared
 Rex Rammell, veterinarian and perennial candidate (Constitution)

General election

Debates 
Complete video of debate, October 6, 2018
Complete video of debate, October 18, 2018

Predictions

Polling

Results

References

External links
Candidates at Vote Smart 
Candidates at Ballotpedia

Official campaign websites
Mark Gordon (R) for Governor
Lawrence Struempf (L) for Governor
Rex Rammell (C) for Governor
Mary Throne (D) for Governor

Gubernatorial
2018
2018 United States gubernatorial elections